Muhammad Safuwan bin Baharudin (born 22 September 1991) is a Singaporean professional footballer who plays as a defender for Malaysia Super League club Negeri Sembilan and Singapore national team. He is known for his powerful headers.

Starting off his professional career as a centre-back, Safuwan's attributes and versatility also allow him to play as a midfielder or forward when required.

Club career

Early years 

Safuwan started out playing as a striker during his Institute of Technical Education years and subsequently as a midfielder at the National Football Academy (NFA). Salim Moin, his NFA Under-17 coach, was credited with switching him to the centre-back position he currently plays in.

Young Lions 

Safuwan began his professional football career with S.League club Young Lions in July 2009, after he was promoted from the National Football Academy Under-18s.

Safuwan was one of the Young Lions players that got involved in an on-pitch fight with several Beijing Guoan Talent players in their S.League match on 7 September 2010. He was charged by the FAS for gross misconduct and bringing the game into disrepute, and was fined S$2,000 for his part in the brawl.

LionsXII 

In December 2011, the FAS announced that Safuwan will join the newly formed LionsXII in the 2012 Malaysia Super League. The LionsXII finished runners-up in their debut season.

Safuwan formed a strong understanding with Baihakki Khaizan in central defence as LionsXII won the 2013 Malaysia Super League with the competition's best defensive record. He contributed with five goals in 26 matches. Amid interest from Thai, Indonesian and rival Malaysia Super League sides including T-Team, he put pen to paper in a new two-year deal with LionsXII in November 2013.
Safuwan capped off his league performances by becoming the first male recipient of the annual Straits Times Athlete of the Year award in 2013.

Following the departure of regular defensive partner Baihakki in 2014, Safuwan formed a new partnership with new LionsXII recruit Afiq Yunos. He also showed his versatility with lauded displays in advanced midfield and attacking roles. Safuwan's performances up front and LionsXII's poor goal scoring form led to head coach Fandi Ahmad having to consider playing him as a forward in more games. Safuwan started in an advanced midfield role behind striker Khairul Amri in a Malaysia Super League match away to Sarawak on 15 March. On 25 March, he scored a late winner over Perak to send LionsXII up to 5th in the league table. He scored his second goal in as many games four days later as LionsXII drew 1–1 with T-Team and followed it up with the opener off a Shahfiq Ghani cross against Sime Darby on 5 April.

Melbourne City 
On 29 January 2015, Safuwan signed a 3-month loan contract with A-League team Melbourne City.

Safuwan earned the contract after his standout performance at a MCFC's training camp in Abu Dhabi, which was held from 10 January 2015 to 19 January 2015. He attended the training camp as part of a development opportunity arranged with the FAS. The club substantiated the decision to take Safuwan on loan with his impressive performances during the training camp, both as a centre back and as a full-back during the club's two friendly matches in the UAE. In the friendly matches, he was pitted against several notable players, such as former Juventus striker Mirko Vučinić. He played as a substitute in the side's second friendly match with Ukrainian Premier League outfit FC Dnipro Dnipropetrovsk, with the match concluding in a 1–1 result.

Safuwan made his debut for Melbourne City in the A-League on 7 February 2015 for the Melbourne Derby against Melbourne Victory. Safuwan scored his first goal for the club against Adelaide United on 27 February 2015. He scored his second goal just a couple of weeks later, against Western Sydney Wanderers to hand his side a 1-0 lead although they could not hang onto the lead and crash to a 3–2 defeat in the end.

Following a spine injury that he sustained in a competitive match against Wellington Phoenix, Safuwan's loan contract was allowed to lapse and was not renewed, despite earlier rumours stating that the club was interested in offering him a permanent contract. After his release, Safuwan returned to play for the LionsXII in the 2015 Malaysia Super League season.

In July 2015, it was reported that there was interest from J.League club Yokohama F Marinos to sign Safuwan on loan for the rest of the season. Although Safuwan stated that he was open to a second move overseas, even if it was on a short-term contract, the move ultimately did not materialise, and Safuwan remained with the LionsXII.

PDRM FA 
Upon the dismissal of LionsXII from the Malaysia Super League following the end of the 2015 season, Safuwan was linked with multiple Malaysian and Thai football clubs upon noting his potential availability. Safuwan signed a one-year loan deal with PDRM FA for the 2016 Malaysia Super League season. The transfer fee was initially estimated as being about S$45,000, but was found later to be closer to S$32,000. This deal was extended for a year despite PDRM FA's relegation into the Malaysian Premier League.

Pahang FA
In 2018, Safuwan signed a contract with Malaysian Super League runners up Pahang FA and was presented alongside Malaysian forward, Norshahrul Idlan. He scored his first goal in a 2-1 victory against ATM FA in the 2018 Malaysia FA Cup. During his time with Pahang, he helped the club win the 2018 Malaysia FA Cup Final before being released at the end of the 2019 Malaysia Super League season despite being contracted until 2020.

Selangor
Safuwan signed for Selangor for the 2020 Malaysia Super League season, ensuring that he will be playing in Malaysia for the 9th season. Safuwan made his debut for the club in the opening match of the 2020 Malaysia Super League season against his former club, Pahang.

Negeri Sembilan
On 22 February 2023, Safuwan joined Negeri Sembilan on a free transfer.

International career

Youth 

Safuwan was part of the Singapore national under-23 football team that won the bronze medal at the 2009 and 2013 Southeast Asian Games.

Senior 

Safuwan made his international debut for Singapore at the age of 19 in a King's Cup match against Thailand on 17 January 2010.

Safuwan contributed to Singapore's then-record fourth ASEAN Football Championship win in 2012. He found himself increasingly paired with Baihakki Khaizan as regular centre-back Daniel Bennett was gradually phased out of the national team set-up.

On 31 August 2017, Safuwan scored from the penalty spot to help Singapore snatch a draw against Hong Kong.

He scored his first international hat-trick on 21 November 2018, helping Singapore to a 6-1 demolition of Timor-Leste in the 2018 AFF Championship.

Safuwan made his 100 caps for the national team on 14 December 2021 against Timor-Leste in the 2020 AFF Championship.

Singapore Selection 
Apart from national team commitments, Safuwan was also part of the Singapore Selection XI squad on several occasions. The selected squad are made up of current Singapore international footballers, as well as players currently participating in the S.League. Safuwan has appeared in all four matches that the Singapore Selection XI has played thus far, such as in the Peter Lim Charity Cup match against 2013–14 La Liga champions Atlético Madrid, a pre-season friendly match against Juventus, as well as in the 2015 Barclays Asia Trophy held in Singapore at the National Stadium.

Personal life
Safuwan is born to Baharudin Abdul Ghani and Suria Haniffa. Safuwan married Alia Qistina, an air stewardess, in 2013.

Safuwan was the first Singaporean to be featured in FIFA 15.

Career statistics

Club 

 Young Lions and LionsXII are ineligible for qualification to AFC competitions in their respective leagues.

International 
Scores and results list Singapore's goal tally first.

Honours

Club 
LionsXII
Malaysia Super League: 2013
FA Cup Malaysia: 2015

Pahang FA
FA Cup Malaysia: 2018

International 
Singapore
ASEAN Football Championship: 2012
Southeast Asian Games: bronze medal – 2009, 2013

Individual 
2014 Singapore Sports Awards: Meritorious Award
2013 Goal Singapore Football Awards: Singapore Player of the Year
The Straits Times Athlete of the Year: 2013
Goal.com-Nike 2012 ASEAN Football Championship Under-23 Player of the Tournament
Goal.com 2012 ASEAN Football Championship Best XI
2011 S.League People's Choice Award
 ASEAN Football Federation Best XI: 2019

References

External links 
 

1991 births
Living people
Singaporean footballers
Singapore international footballers
Singapore Premier League players
LionsXII players
Malaysia Super League players
Young Lions FC players
Association football central defenders
Singaporean people of Malay descent
A-League Men players
Melbourne City FC players
Negeri Sembilan FC players
Singaporean expatriate footballers
Expatriate soccer players in Australia
Singaporean expatriate sportspeople in Australia
Footballers at the 2010 Asian Games
Footballers at the 2014 Asian Games
Southeast Asian Games bronze medalists for Singapore
Southeast Asian Games medalists in football
Competitors at the 2009 Southeast Asian Games
Competitors at the 2013 Southeast Asian Games
Asian Games competitors for Singapore
FIFA Century Club